"Shotgun Rider" is a song recorded by American country music artist Tim McGraw. It was released on September 8, 2014 as the third single from his second studio album for Big Machine Records, Sundown Heaven Town. The song was written by Marv Green, Hillary Lindsey, and Troy Verges.

McGraw previously recorded a different song of the same name on his 2007 album, Let It Go.

Critical reception
Billy Dukes of Taste of Country gave "Shotgun Rider" a favorable review, writing that "the song is an example of how the singer, producer and songwriter all need to come together to create beautiful music." Chuck Dauphin of Billboard called it "the perfect mix of old-school McGraw with some stirring steel guitar work and a few new sounds with some nifty guitar riffs." Kurt Wolff of radio.com called it "a midtempo song with a cool, confident melody that feels tailor-made for a road-trip mixtape."

Music video
The music video was directed by Bennett Miller and premiered in October 2014.

Chart performance
"Shotgun Rider" debuted at number 51 on the U.S. Billboard Country Airplay chart for the week of September 20, 2014. It also debuted at number 25 on the U.S. Billboard Hot Country Songs chart for the week of October 4, 2014. The single was certified Gold by the RIAA on January 9, 2015, and as of March 2015, the single has sold 665,000 copies in the United States.

Year-end charts

Certifications

References

2014 songs
2014 singles
Tim McGraw songs
Big Machine Records singles
Songs written by Marv Green
Songs written by Hillary Lindsey
Songs written by Troy Verges
Song recordings produced by Byron Gallimore
Song recordings produced by Tim McGraw